A staffane or [n]staffane is an organic compound, a polycyclic hydrocarbon with molecular structure H-[-C≡(-CH2-)3≡C-]n-H, for some integer n ≥ 1.  The chemical formula is therefore C5nH6n+2

Staffanes were first obtained in 1988 by P. Kazynski and J. Michl, by spontaneous polymerization of [1.1.1]-propellane C5H6 or C2(=CH2)3.  In the reaction, the axial C-C bond of the propellane (the "bridge") is broken, creating a free bond on each of the two axial carbons (the "bridgeheads").  The resulting structural unit [-C≡(-CH2-)3≡C-] is a rigid cage, consisting of two carbon atoms joined by three methylene bridges; therefore the joined units are constrained to lie on a straight line.  This feature has generated substantial interest among nanotechnology researchers, who have considered staffane oligomers as convenient "rigid rods" for building all sorts of nanostructures.

An oligomer with a specific number n of units is denoted by  [n]staffane (e.g., [1]staffane, [2]staffane, etc..)  The notation [n]staffane is used when the number of units is variable or unspecified; in this case the "n" in the brackets is not a variable, but the letter "n", considered part of the name.

References

Hydrocarbons
Polycyclic nonaromatic hydrocarbons